Joseph Sanda (9 May 1985 – 7 December 2020) was a Cameroonian racing cyclist. He was part of the SNH Vélo Club as an amateur, then became one of its coaches.

Sanda died on 7 December 2020 in Yaoundé following an illness.

Awards

2004
3rd place in the Cameroon Road Championships

2006
Winner of the 2nd and 9th stages of International East Tour

2007
Winner of the 6th stage of the International East Tour
Winner of the Prologue of the Grand Prix Chantal Biya

2008
Winner of the 1st stage of the Tour du Cameroun

2009
Winner of the 10th stage of the Tour du Cameroun
Winner of the 4th stage of the International East Tour
Winner of the 2nd stage of the Grand Prix Chantal Biya
2nd place in the Grand Prix Chantal Biya

References

1985 births
2020 deaths
Cameroonian male cyclists